Otto John Hehnke (c. 1870 – September 24, 1944) was a German-born American architect. He lived in Scottsbluff, Nebraska, where he designed the Fontenelle Apartment House and the Scottsbluff Carnegie Library, two buildings listed on the National Register of Historic Places.

References

1944 deaths
German emigrants to the United States
Architects from Hamburg
People from Scottsbluff, Nebraska
Architects from Nebraska
20th-century American architects
Year of birth uncertain